Thomas Huggins may refer to:

Tom Huggins, cricketer
Thomas Huggins (MP)
Thomas Huggins, founder of Impact Fighting Championships